Henry B. Roberts was a member of the Wisconsin State Assembly during the 1848 session. Roberts represented the 2nd District of Racine County, Wisconsin. He was a Democrat.

References

People from Racine County, Wisconsin
Year of birth missing
Year of death missing
Democratic Party members of the Wisconsin State Assembly